Operation Kentucky Jumper was a joint U.S. Army and Army of the Republic of Vietnam (ARVN) military operation during the Vietnam War designed to seek out and destroy People's Army of Vietnam (PAVN) and Vietcong (VC) units, interdict their base areas and infiltration routes and to support the Accelerated Pacification Program southwest of Huế, Thừa Thiên Province.

Operation
On 12 March at approximately 17:00, troops from the 2nd Brigade, 101st Airborne Division air assaulted into an area 12 miles southwest of Huế and immediately made contact receiving small arms, automatic weapons and Rocket-propelled grenade (RPG) fire from an estimated PAVN company. The infantry returned fire killing 12 PAVN and capturing one individual and two crew-served weapons in a  bunker complex. U.S. losses were two killed and two wounded KIA.

The troops defended with unit weapons, point-blank artillery fire and by helicopter gunships and an AC-47 Spooky gunship of the 14th Special Operations Wing. Approximately ten PAVN penetrated the outer perimeter, but in the close fighting were either killed or driven out. The PAVN withdrew at 06:00 and ten PAVN dead were counted and one suspect detained. U.S. losses were 13 killed (including nine Kentucky Army National Guardsmen from the 138th Artillery).

Aftermath
The operation resulted in 317 PAVN/VC killed and 55 crew-served and 254 individual weapons captured. U.S. casualties were 61 killed and 409 wounded.

References

1969 in Vietnam
Kentucky Jumper
Kentucky Jumper
Kentucky Jumper
Battles and operations of the Vietnam War in 1969
History of Thừa Thiên Huế province